To megalo pazari (Grand Bazaar) is a Greek adaptation of the hit U.S. game show Let's Make A Deal. originally, it ran on Mega from 1992 to 1993. Thirteen years later, by it was revived as To pio Megalo Pazari running on its new channel called Alpha TV from 2006 to 2007. Both versions were hosted by Andreas Mikroutsikos.

Ten years later, the show has now be repackaged as Kane Pazari (Make a Bargain) hosted by Doretta Papadimitriou and airing on Skai since 2017.

External links

Mega Channel original programming
Alpha TV original programming
Skai TV original programming
1992 Greek television series debuts
1993 Greek television series endings
2006 Greek television series debuts
2007 Greek television series endings
1990s Greek television series
2000s Greek television series
Greek-language television shows
Greek game shows